Two in a Big City is a 1942 German romantic comedy film directed by Volker von Collande and starring Claude Farell, Karl John and Marianne Simson. A German soldier on leave in Berlin goes looking for his pen pal who he has never met called Gisela. He meets instead a woman with the same name and falls in love with her.

Cast

References

Bibliography 
 Hull, David Stewart. Film in the Third Reich: A Study of the German Cinema, 1933–1945. University of California Press, 1969.

External links 
 

1942 films
Films of Nazi Germany
German romantic comedy films
1942 romantic comedy films
1940s German-language films
Films directed by Volker von Collande
Films set in Berlin
Films shot in Berlin
Tobis Film films
German black-and-white films
1940s German films